Vel Phillips Memorial High School is a public high school in Madison, Wisconsin, United States. It was established in 1966 and is part of the Madison Metropolitan School District.

The school is named after Vel Phillips, an American attorney, politician, jurist, and Civil Rights activist, who served as the first female alderperson and judge in Milwaukee, Wisconsin and as Secretary of State of Wisconsin (1979-1983). Previously named James Madison Memorial High School after Founding Father James Madison, the school was unanimously renamed by the Madison Metropolitan School District board in 2021 after concern was raised by the public over Madison's ownership of slaves.

Academics
Memorial offers classes ranging from Algebra 1 to Photography. Chinese, German, French and Spanish are some of their language classes.

The school also hosts the Madison school district's planetarium and offers an Astronomy class.

Small Learning Communities grant 
In 2001, Memorial received a U.S. Department of Education Small Learning Communities federal grant to support a "neighborhood" reorganization. The four neighborhoods are Rock, Wolf, Fox, and Wisconsin .

School newspapers 
The official school newspaper is The Sword and Shield and until 2014 kept all issues online.  Independent newspapers, The Spartacus and Aficionado existed at one time, but have all ceased distribution. The Independent was created after the 1990–91 school year by The Sword and Shield staff.

Extracurricular activities 
Memorial offers interscholastic sports and extramural activities. The Spartans have won 64 state championships across all sports, ranking third in the state of Wisconsin.

Athletics

Baseball
1990 State champion; beat Marinette, 8-7 (9)
1992 State champion; beat Oconomowoc, 10-8

Basketball (boys)
2005 State champion; beat Milwaukee Vincent, 63-55
2009 State champion; beat Racine Horlick, 56-41
2011 State champion; beat De Pere, 80-78 (3OT)

Cross country (boys)
1967 State champion; beat Antigo, 80-82
1969 State champion; beat Milwaukee Marshall, 52-109
1991 State champion; beat Homestead, 65-97

Cross country (girls)
1980 State champion; beat Neenah, 98-114
1984 State champion; beat Neenah, 85-99

Football (boys)
1984 State Runners Up; 10w - 2l Current Winningest Team

Golf (boys)
1972 State champion; beat Whitefish Bay, 611-618
1984 State champion; beat Madison West, 647-649
1990 State champion; beat Eau Claire North, 670-686

Golf (girls)
1977 State champion; beat Madison West, 710-739
1979 State champion; beat Appleton East, 710-728
1980 State champion; beat Appleton West, 729-785

Hockey (boys)
1976 State champion; beat Superior, 4-3 (3OT)
1977 State champion; beat Superior, 3-2 (2OT)
1979 State champion; beat Madison East, 3-1
1980 State champion; beat Rice Lake, 6-2
1985 State champion; beat Stevens Point, 3-1
1988 State champion; beat Madison West, 2-0
1998 State champion; beat Stevens Point, 4-3 (OT)
2000 State champion; beat Wausau West, 4-3

Soccer (boys)
2006 State champion; beat Brookfield East, 2-0

Soccer (Girls)
1986 State champion; beat Neenah, 1-0
1987 State champion; beat Arrowhead, 1-0

Swimming and diving (boys)
1980 State champion; beat Whitefish Bay, 112-90
1981 State champion; beat Homestead, 148-93
1986 State champion; beat Madison West, 260-204
1992 State champion; beat Madison West, 296-208
1994 State champion; beat Arrowhead, 282-280
1996 State champion; beat Arrowhead, 266-238
2005 State champion; beat Arrowhead, 269.5-222
2006 State champion; beat Arrowhead, 272-245
2007 State champion; beat Arrowhead, 257.5-212.5
2009 State champion; beat Sauk Prairie/Wisconsin Heights, 200.5-182.5
2011 State champion; beat Waukesha South/Catholic Memorial, 234.5-192
2012 State champion; beat Arrowhead, 326-234
2013 State champion; beat Madison West, 316-206
2014 State champion; beat Madison West, 319–216.5
2015 State champion; beat Madison West, 350.5-201
2016 State champion; beat Madison West, 314-202

Swimming and diving (girls)
1970 State champion; beat Menomonee Falls North, 128–121.5
1971 State champion; beat Menomonee Falls North, 127.5-116
1972 State champion; beat Madison East, 174-118
1974 State champion; beat Madison West, 230-179
1975 State champion; beat Madison West, 234-168
1976 State champion; beat Brookfield Central, 215-132
1978 State champion; beat Madison West, 176-153
1979 State champion; beat Brookfield Central, 210-114
1988 State champion; beat Madison West, 277–212.5
1993 State champion; beat Arrowhead, 325.5-311
1994 State champion; beat Madison West, 310-5-301.5
1999 State champion; beat Arrowhead, 313–242.5
2000 State champion; beat Arrowhead, 320.5-236
2001 State champion; beat Madison West, 295–267.5

Tennis (girls)
1988 State champion; beat Brookfield Central, 30.5-28

Track and field (boys)
1970 State champion; tied Racine Case & Whitefish Bay, 14-14
1973 State champion; beat Whitefish Bay, 21-18

Track and field (girls)
1972 State champion; beat Nicolet, 21-18
1973 State champion; beat Madison West, 24-18
1977 State champion; tied Madison East, 40-40
1979 State champion; beat Janesville Parker & Madison West, 46-30
2003 State champion; beat Waukesha West, Hartford, Cudahy & Waukesha Catholic Memorial, 34-25

Notable alumni
 Christina and Michelle Naughton, class of 2007; pianists
Tyrone Braxton, class of 1983; former NFL safety
 Bill Foster (Illinois politician), class of 1972; physicist and Illinois Congressman
 Jake Ferguson, class of 2017; tight end for the Dallas Cowboys
 Daurice Fountain, class of 2014; wide receiver for the Kansas City Chiefs
 Rick Graf, class 1982; former NFL football linebacker
 Tamara Grigsby, class of 1993; Wisconsin State Assembly
 Ari Herstand, class of 2003;  singer-songwriter, author, actor, and blogger 
 Jack Ikegwuonu, class of 2004; former NFL cornerback
 Mark Johnson, former NHL player and gold medalist with the US Olympic Men's Hockey team at the 1980 Winter Olympics; UW-Madison women's hockey coach
 Jennifer Korbee, class of 1998; singer and actress
 Po-Shen Loh, class of 2000; mathematician and IMO coach
 Wesley Matthews, class of 2005; NBA guard
 Jeronne Maymon (born 1991), former basketball player for Hapoel Eilat B.C. of the Israeli Basketball Premier League
 Keaton Nankivil, class of 2007; Basketball player former basketball player for the Wisconsin Badgers and currently playing basketball in Italy professionally
 Robert Songolo Ngijol, basketball player
 Jay Norvell, former NFL linebacker
 Dave Pasch, class of 1990; ESPN announcer covering the NBA, college football and basketball
 Jeffrey Sprecher, class of 1974; founder and CEO of IntercontinentalExchange 
 Sherri Steinhauer, former pro golfer
 Saahil "UNiVeRsE" Arora, class of 2008; professional Dota 2 player for Evil Geniuses

References

External links

 

High schools in Madison, Wisconsin
Public high schools in Wisconsin
Educational institutions established in 1966
1966 establishments in Wisconsin